Carlos Mirabal (born April 24, 1973) is a former professional baseball pitcher who played professionally from 1996 to 2008.

Career 
Mirabal played for the Altoona Rail Kings of the North Atlantic League in 1996. From 2000 to 2005, he played for the Nippon-Ham Fighters in Japan's Nippon Professional Baseball. From 2006 to 2008, he played with the Atlantic League's Newark Bears winning the league Championship in 2007.

External links

1973 births
American expatriate baseball players in Japan
American expatriate baseball players in Taiwan
Living people
Chiayi-Tainan Luka players
Koos Group Whales players
Nippon Professional Baseball pitchers
Nippon Ham Fighters players
Hokkaido Nippon-Ham Fighters players
Newark Bears players
Altoona Rail Kings players